The 2002 Mercedes Cup was a men's tennis tournament played on outdoor clay courts at the Tennis Club Weissenhof in Stuttgart, Germany and was part of the International Series of the 2002 ATP Tour. The tournament ran from 15 July until 21 July 2002. Mikhail Youzhny won the singles title.

Finals

Singles

 Mikhail Youzhny defeated  Guillermo Cañas 6–3, 3–6, 3–6, 6–4, 6–4
 It was Youzhny's only title of the year and the 1st of his career.

Doubles

 Joshua Eagle /  David Rikl defeated  David Adams /  Gastón Etlis 6–3, 6–4
 It was Eagle's 2nd title of the year and the 4th of his career. It was Rikl's 4th title of the year and the 26th of his career.

References

External links
 Official website 
 ATP tournament profile

Stuttgart Open
Stuttgart Open
2002 in German tennis